The Rosso Sisters was an American musical group, made up of four expatriate siblings originally from the United Kingdom: Georgina, Milly, Becky, and Lola.

The group was signed to Virgin Records's Capitol Records label in the beginning of 2014. Later that year, they opened for Demi Lovato on the South American leg of her Neon Lights Tour.

The group disbanded in February 2015, due to their mother's death.

History

2013–15: The Rosso Sisters
Group was formed in 2013 by sisters Georgina (b. 1991), twins Milly and Becky (b. 1994) and Lola Rosso (b. 1996). Their oldest sister Bianca wasn't added to the band. Milly and Becky already had an acting career between 2006 and 2010 and recorded song "Lucky Girl" for their film Legally Blondes (2009).

They were signed by Virgin Records in 2014 by Steve Barnett and were managed by Paul Kevin Jonas, Sr., the father of the Jonas Brothers. They were chosen to be an opening act for Demi Lovato's Neon Lights Tour in South America. Their debut extended play Hola Hola was released on April 22, 2014. It was promoted on Neon Lights Tour and produced single "Hola Hola". Another single "I Like Boys" was released same year. After the tour ended, no new music was released, except for song "Waterloo" released on the ABBA tribute album Dancing Queens, released on 9 September 2014.

In November, the sisters stated that their mother Anthea had cancer. The group disbanded three months later after their mother died. They wrote: "We are so incredibly heartbroken & devastated that our beautiful mom Anthea passed away after fighting an extremely tough battle with pancreatic cancer. She was our best friend and inspiration, & the most caring, loving, selfless, kind hearted person we could ever imagine. After much thought & consideration, we have decided not to carry on with our girl group and making music, & to close this chapter in our lives, even though it was just the beginning and we hadn't released music in the US yet. We're soo sorry to anyone we're disappointing, but during these extremely difficult past few months, our hopes and dreams for the future have changed. We'll never forget the amazing memories we made as a music group while it lasted, & we're so happy we had the chance to meet & talk to such genuinely sweet and supportive fans like you guys. Thank u soo much to all of you who have ever written us a nice message, sent us well wishes, prayed for us or our mom, or supported us in some way. We are so grateful. We love you" on February 14, 2015.

Discography

Extended plays
 Hola Hola (2014)

Singles
 "Hola Hola" (2014)
 "I Like Boys" (2014)

Other songs
 "Waterloo" (2014)
 "Wasteland" (2014)
 "I'm Single, Bilingual and Ready To Mingle" (2014)

Concert tours
Opening act
 The Neon Lights Tour (2014)

See also
 Camilla and Rebecca Rosso
 List of vocal groups

References

External links
 

British pop music groups
American pop music groups
Capitol Records artists
Family musical groups
2013 establishments in California
Musical groups established in 2013
Musical groups from California
Musical quartets
Musical groups disestablished in 2015